The following are the national records in athletics in Bhutan maintained by the Bhutan Amateur Athletic Federation (BAAF).

Outdoor

Key to tables:

+ = en route to a longer distance

ht = hand timing

nw = no wind measurement

Men

Women

Indoor

Men

Women

References

External links
 BAAF web site

Bhutan
Records
Athletics